Jung is a 1996 Indian Hindi-language action drama film, starring Mithun Chakraborty and Aditya Pancholi (in double role) Ajay Devgn, Rambha, Sadashiv Amrapurkar, Tinnu Anand and Sujata Mehta.

Plot
Jung has Mithun and Ajay Devgn playing brothers, but due to circumstances, police officer Mithun had to cross swords with his brother to protect justice. The third angle of the film is the double role portrayed by Aditya Pancholi, one negative and the  positive.

Cast
Mithun Chakraborty as ACP Arjun Saxena 
Aditya Pancholi as Engine Driver Suraj /  Billa (dual role)
Ajay Devgan as Ajay Bahadur Saxena 
Rambha as Madhu 
Vani Viswanath as Laxmi Saxena, ACP Arjun's wife. 
Sujata Mehta as Sita 
Sadashiv Amrapurkar as Chakradhari Chaudhary
Tinnu Anand as Sita's father

Production

The role of Arjun Saxena was first offered to Sanjay Dutt but he refused to play that role, then makers approached Anil Kapoor but he also declined after reading the script of his character, the role of Ajay Saxena was first offered to Chunky Pandey then Akshay Kumar but both actor refused to play that role and Akshay Kumar says in an interview that he left the movie because he thinks that his role has nothing to do in the film, then the makers cast Ajay Devgn to play that role. But the role of Arjun Saxena was still empty, after a lot of declines the makers persuade Amitabh Bachchan but he withdrew himself due to poor Script, then they approached Sunil Shetty but he also left the project due to busy schedule and he was also not interested for this role, then makers approached Mithun Chakraborty and he accepted this role by saying that he is always ready for these types of characters

Soundtrack
The music was composed by Nadeem Shravan and the songs were written by Anand Bakshi. "Deewana Deewana" is based on "Thillana Thillana" from Muthu (1995).

References

External links
 

1996 films
1990s Hindi-language films
Indian action drama films
1990s action drama films
Films directed by T. Rama Rao
Films scored by Nadeem–Shravan
Mithun's Dream Factory films
Films shot in Ooty